Fifth Street Bridge can refer to any several bridges in the United States:

Fifth Street Bridge (Augusta, Georgia)
Fifth Street Bridge (Richmond, Virginia), also called the Fifth Street Viaduct
Southwest Fifth St. Bridge in Des Moines, Iowa
West Fifth Street Bridge, also called the Ashtabula lift bridge, in Ashtabula, Ohio
Arthur J. DiTommaso Memorial Bridge